In Greek mythology, Bolbe (Ancient Greek: Βόλβη) was a beautiful lake goddess or nymph, who dwelled in a Macedonian lake of the same name (modern Lake Volvi). Like other lake gods and goddesses, Bolbe's offspring were Limnades, nymphs who live in freshwater lakes. According to Athenaeus, Bolbe was the mother of Olynthus by Heracles.

Note

References 

 Athenaeus of Naucratis, The Deipnosophists or Banquet of the Learned. London. Henry G. Bohn, York Street, Covent Garden. 1854. Online version at the Perseus Digital Library.
 Athenaeus of Naucratis, Deipnosophistae. Kaibel. In Aedibus B.G. Teubneri. Lipsiae. 1887. Greek text available at the Perseus Digital Library.

Greek sea goddesses
Naiads
Women of Heracles
Water spirits